Hits on DVD: Despina Vandi is the second video album by Greek singer Despina Vandi, released in 2004 by Minos EMI in Greece and Cyprus. It features music videos from before she signed with Heaven Music and is a part of the series of compilations Hits on DVD.

Track listing
"Gela Mou"
"Den Iparhi Tipota"
"Adiexodo" (feat. Giannis Parios)
"Efiges"
"Den Pethaini I Agapi"
"Esena Perimeno"
"Perittos"
"Nihtolouloudo Mou"
"Deka Endoles"
"Thelo Na Se Xehaso"
"Katalliles Proipotheseis" (feat. Giorgos Lembesis)
"A Pa Pa"
"Giatriko"
"To Koritsaki Sou"
"S'ta 'Dosa Ola"
"Spania"
"Oute Ena Efharisto"
"Ipofero"
"Lipame"
Extra features
"Horis Esena" (Live)
"S'ta 'Dosa Ola" (Live)
Interviews
"I Ikogenia Mou" (My family)
"Se Pious Hrostao Efharisto" (I would like to thank)
"Ta Hronia Tou Scholiou" (The school years)
"Sti Thessaloniki" (In Thessaloniki)
"Profities" (Prophecies)
"Ta Fitika Hronia" (Teenage years)
"Den Mou Haristike Tipota" (Nothing was given to me)
"Discography"
"Credits"

External links
 Official site

Despina Vandi video albums
Greek-language albums
2004 video albums
Music video compilation albums
2004 compilation albums
Minos EMI compilation albums
Minos EMI video albums